"Don't Cry Wolf" is a single by English punk rock band the Damned.

Released 11 December 1977, the single was the group's last release for Stiff Records. It was also the last studio recording by the band to feature either Brian James or Lu Edmunds. The Damned split during their 1978 tour, and reformed with an altered lineup in 1979. The first 5,000 copies of the UK release were pressed on pink vinyl, and all the British releases were issued without a picture sleeve.

The single was reissued in Stiff's Damned 4 Pack mail-order set. A CD version was issued in the Stiff Singles 1976-1977 box set by Castle Music in 2003.

The single was also issued in Belgium, Germany and the Netherlands.

Track listing
 "Don't Cry Wolf" (James) - 3:10
 "One Way Love" (James)  - 3:29

Production credits

 Producers:
 Nick Mason
 Musicians:
 Dave Vanian − vocals
 Brian James − guitar
 Captain Sensible − bass		
 Rat Scabies − drums
 Lu Edmunds − guitar

External links

1977 songs
1977 singles
The Damned (band) songs
Songs written by Brian James (guitarist)
Song recordings produced by Nick Mason
Stiff Records singles